Barely Famous Hits is the fourth studio album by American country music duo The Warren Brothers. It was released in 2005 via BNA Records. The album reprises songs from the duo's first three studio albums, two of which were also released on BNA.

It received a rating of 3½ stars on Allmusic. Stephen Thomas Erlewine considered the songs well-written but thought that the brothers did not have a strong musical presence.

Track listing

Personnel

The Warren Brothers
Brad Warren- background vocals, acoustic guitar, electric guitar
Brett Warren- lead vocals, acoustic guitar, harmonica

Additional Musicians
Dave Berg- background vocals
Eric Borash- electric guitar, mandolin
Bruce Bouton- keyboards, lap steel guitar, pedal steel guitar
Mike Brignardello- bass guitar
Tom Bukovac- acoustic guitar
Luke Butta- violin
Paul Bushnell- bass guitar
Stephen E. Byam- pedal steel guitar
Angelo Collura- drums, percussion
Mike Daly- pedal steel guitar
Sara Evans- background vocals on "That's the Beat of a Heart"
Chris Farren- keyboards, background vocals
Shannon Forrest- drums, percussion
Larry Franklin- fiddle
Byron Gallimore- synthesizer strings
Tony Harrell- keyboards, synthesizer strings
John Hobbs- keyboards, piano
Jennie Hoeft- drums, percussion
Mike Holder- dobro, lap steel guitar, pedal steel guitar
Ronn Huff- string conductor, string arrangements
Randy Kohrs- dobro
Chris McHugh- drums, percussion
Marty McIntosh- bass guitar, background vocals
Georgia Middleman- background vocals
Greg Morrow- drums, percussion
The Nashville String Machine- strings
Steve Nathan- piano, synthesizer, synthesizer strings
LeAnn Phelan- background vocals
Darrell Scott- bouzouki, dobro, mandolin
Adam Shoenfeld- electric guitar
Rob Stoney- Hammond B-3 organ, piano, Wurlitzer
Benmont Tench- keyboards
Jonathan Yudkin- cello

Chart performance

References

2005 albums
BNA Records albums
The Warren Brothers albums